The Whites, or White Finland, was the name used to refer to the refugee government and forces under Pehr Evind Svinhufvud's first senate who opposed the "Reds", or the Finnish Socialist Workers' Republic, during the Finnish civil war (1918).

Background 
The Whites had no clear political aims in common, other than stopping the communist revolutionary Reds from taking power and returning to constitutional rule by the Senate (the government of the Grand Duchy of Finland) which was formed by the non-socialist parties of the Eduskunta (parliament) and returning to the Rule of Law. The provisional head of state of White Finland was Pehr Evind Svinhufvud, chairman of the senate at the time, and its military was commanded by Carl Gustaf Emil Mannerheim.

The Conservative Senate government was supported by the remnants of the Finnish Legion stationed along the eastern front. This emerged as the paramilitary White Guard, Jäger troops, and were expanded with the addition of volunteers and drafted peasants, as well as the political right, separatist-minded from Russia. The Jägers nationalists were recruited by Imperial Germany between 1914 and 1917 for military training, even participating alongside their German benefactors, in combat against Russian forces (both nominally owing loyalty to one Czar), before returning to Finland for the upcoming civil war. Because Russia did not draft Finns for combat duties, their experience as First World War veterans had significant impact during the war. They received arms and equipment matching those of regular German troops, and sporadic further military support from the German Empire.

Campaign 
The Whites' campaign was initially challenged by the goal of capturing the Varkaus industrial center. The 1,200 Red forces defending the city finally surrendered after the invading troops secured the surrounding areas. This battle was one of the turning points of the civil war since it gave the Whites control of the northern part of Finland. The success of the campaign is attributed to the White's better equipment, organization, and unity.

By February 1917, Finland was already divided with the Whites controlling the area north of Pori, Tampere, Lahti, Lappeenranta, and Viipuri while the urban areas to the south were under the Red zone. With the assistance of the Germans under General Rüdiger von der Goltz, the Whites were able to capture Helsinki and Tampere until the Reds finally fled to Soviet Russia in April and the victors claimed the entire former Grand Duchy of Finland. The initial frontlines were established rather quickly, and over the course of the war, Whites conquered all of Finnish territory. The Finnish constitution of 1919 established the modern Republic of Finland, and the Treaty of Tartu between Finland and Russia (1920) confirmed the outcome. Thus, the Republic of Finland is the sole successor of White Finland.

See also 
 Finnish Civil War
 White Guards (Finland)
 Classical Conservatism 
 Edmund Burke's Reflections on the Revolution in France''
 Rule of Law
 Legalism (Western philosophy)

References

Finnish Civil War

Post–Russian Empire states